Ablations is a 2014 French-Belgian drama film directed by Arnold de Parscau.

Plot
A man wakes up in a wasteland, with no memory of the night before, a lower back scar. A former mistress, surgeon, tells him that stole a kidney. Obsessed with this flight, he will sacrifice everything to find him: his family, his job ... to go crazy.

Cast

 Denis Ménochet as Pastor Cartalas
 Virginie Ledoyen as Léa Cartalas
 Florence Thomassin as Anna
 Philippe Nahon as Wortz
 Yolande Moreau as Wortz's Assistant
 Serge Riaboukine as Jean-Michel Poncreux
 Lily-Rose Miot as Juli
  as Mikako
  as Patrice
 Louane Gonçalves Santos as Miguel
 Luka Breidigan Campana as Bruno
 Philippe Rebbot as The veterinary

Release
The film was presented at the Festival international du film fantastique de Gérardmer, the Champs-Élysées Film Festival and at the Chicago International Film Festival.

References

External links

2014 films
2014 drama films
French drama films
Belgian drama films
2010s French-language films
2010s French films